This is a list of Department Assemblies in the Republic of Colombia.

See also

Legislative Branch of Colombia
List of Colombian Department Governors

Colombian department assemblies